The 10th Luftwaffe Field Division was an infantry division of the Luftwaffe branch of the Wehrmacht that fought in World War II.

History 
the division was formed in October 1942 from surplus ground crew Luftwaffe personnel in western Germany and was used on the German-Soviet front from December 1942. On 1 November 1943, the division was transferred to the Wehrmacht and renamed Field Division 10 (L). At that time, the Luftwaffe Field Division 10 was stationed in front of the Oranienbaum Bridgehead in northern Russia as part of the 18th Army. The Division was disbanded on 3 February 1944 and the remains of the division were incorporated into the 170th Infantry Division.

Commanders
Generalmajor Walter Wadehn, (25 September 1942 - 5 November 1943)
Generalmajor Hermann von Wedel (5 November 1943 - 29 January 1944)

Sources 
Lexikon der Wehrmacht Luftwaffen-Felddivision 10
Lexikon der Wehrmacht 10. Feld-Division (L)

0*010
Military units and formations established in 1942
Military units and formations disestablished in 1944